Hyleas Fountain (born January 14, 1981) is an American heptathlete. She was the silver medalist in the event at the 2008 Beijing Olympics.

Career

Early years
Fountain was born in Columbus, Georgia, and was a member of the 1992 Harrisburg Parks and Recreation track club under coach Horace Camero, until 1994 Greater Paxtonia Track Club under coach Darnell L Williams. She attended Central Dauphin East High School in Harrisburg, Pennsylvania where she was under the coaching of Al Moten, Fred Leuschner, Jim Seidler, and Braden Cook. She then continued her career at Barton Community College (Kansas) under Coach Jack Bowman and then going to the University of Georgia under coach Wayne Norton. Fountain has won NCAA championships in both the heptathlon and long jump.

2005-2006

She finished 12th at the 2005 World Championships and eighth at the 2006 World Indoor Championships.

2008

In 2008, Fountain qualified for the 2008 Summer Olympics by winning the U.S. Olympic Trials with a personal best score of 6667 points in the heptathlon. Fountain set personal bests in five of the seven heptathlon events at the Trials.

At the Olympics themselves, she originally finished in the bronze medal position. However, after the silver medallist Lyudmila Blonska tested positive on her drug test, Fountain was elevated to the silver medal position.

2009-2010

Fountain seemed sure to qualify for the 2009 World Championships in Athletics after gaining a significant lead in the heptathlon at the US Championships (5193 points after five events). However, she injured her neck in the high jump event and aggravated the injury after a personal best long jump, thus ruling her out of the US and World Championships.

She finished fourth in the pentathlon at the 2010 IAAF World Indoor Championships, setting a personal record of 4753 points as well as setting indoor bests in the shot put, high jump and 800 meters. Later that year she took on reigning world champion Jessica Ennis in a three-event challenge at the Adidas Grand Prix. Although Fountain won only one of the events, she won the competition by merit of having the greatest points total.

2011

She led the 2011 World Championships in Daegu, South Korea after 2 events, but then fell away and pulled out of the final event (800 meters) without announcing why.

2012
Qualified for the 2012 London Olympics on June 30, 2012.

In the Heptathlon at the London 2012 Olympics, Hyleas was competitive up until a disappointing Long Jump, where she began to suffer from lower back pains.  She continued into the Javelin but was only able to make a non-competitive performance.  She did not compete in the 800 metres and while finishing with the highest incomplete score, officially registered a DNF.

Personal bests (outdoor)

Last updated 14 January 2015.

References

External links
 
 

1981 births
Living people
Sportspeople from Columbus, Georgia
Sportspeople from Harrisburg, Pennsylvania 
American heptathletes
Olympic silver medalists for the United States in track and field
Athletes (track and field) at the 2008 Summer Olympics
Athletes (track and field) at the 2012 Summer Olympics
Medalists at the 2008 Summer Olympics
World Athletics Championships athletes for the United States
Barton Cougars women's track and field athletes
Junior college women's track and field athletes in the United States
Track and field athletes from Pennsylvania
USA Outdoor Track and Field Championships winners
American Ninja Warrior contestants